This is a comparison of web frameworks for front-end web development that are heavily reliant on JavaScript code for their behavior.

General information

Features

Browser support

Notes

JavaScript frameworks
Ajax (programming)
Web development
Web frameworks
JavaScript web frameworks